The Victoria Palace Theatre is a West End theatre in Victoria Street, in the City of Westminster, opposite Victoria Station. The structure is categorised as a Grade II* listed building.

History

Origins
The theatre began life as a small concert room above the stables of the Royal Standard Hotel, a small hotel and tavern built in 1832 at what was then 522 Stockbridge Terrace, on the site of the present theatre – not, as sometimes stated, on land where the train station now stands. The proprietor, John Moy, enlarged the building, and by 1850 it became known as Moy's Music Hall.  Alfred Brown took it over in 1863, refurbished it, and renamed it the Royal Standard Music Hall.

The hotel was demolished in 1886, by which time the main line terminus, Victoria Station and its new Grosvenor Hotel, had transformed the area into a major transport hub. The railways were at this time building grand hotel structures at their termini, and Victoria was one of the first. Added to this was the integration of the electric underground system and the building of Victoria Street.  The owner of the music hall, Thomas Dickey, had it rebuilt along more ambitious lines in 1886 by Richard Wake, retaining the name Royal Standard Music Hall.

Matcham's theatre
The Royal Standard was demolished in 1910, and in its place was built, at a cost of £12,000, the current theatre, The Victoria Palace. It was designed by prolific theatre architect Frank Matcham, and opened 6 November 1911. The original design featured a sliding roof that helped cool the auditorium during intervals in the summer months.

Under impresario Alfred Butt, the Victoria Palace Theatre continued the musical theatre tradition by presenting mainly varieties, and under later managements, repertory and revues. Perhaps because of its music hall linkage, the plays were not always taken seriously. In 1934, the theatre presented Young England, a patriotic play written by the Rev. Walter Reynolds, then 83.  It received such amusingly bad reviews that it became a cult hit and played to full houses for 278 performances before transferring to two other West End theatres.  
Intended by its author as a serious work celebrating the triumph of good over evil and the virtues of the Boy Scout Movement, it was received as an uproarious comedy.  Before long, audiences had learned the key lines and were joining in at all the choicest moments.  The scoutmistress rarely said the line 'I must go and attend to my girls' water' without at least fifty voices in good-humoured support.

A return to revue brought new success. Me and My Girl was a hit in its original production at the theatre, opening in 1937 starring Lupino Lane. In 1939, songs from this show formed the first live broadcast of a performance by the BBC, and listeners could sing along to The Lambeth Walk. In early 1945, towards the end of the war in Europe, variety was presented under the stewardship of Lupino Lane. Headlining the bill from his radio series was Will Hay, with his schoolboy retinue of Charles Hawtrey and John Clark, and among the "turns" was Stainless Stephen, a comic acrobat comedian duo, and Victor Barna (then world champion table tennis player) giving an exhibition, who would invite audience members up on to the stage to see if they could beat him in ten points. From 1947 through 1962, Jack Hylton produced The Crazy Gang series of comedy revues, with a glittering company of variety performers including Flanagan and Allen, Nervo and Knox, and Naughton and Gold.

The long-running Black and White Minstrel Show played through the 1960s until 1972.  In 1982, a production of The Little Foxes, saw Elizabeth Taylor making her London stage debut.  Another unusually long-running show at the theatre was Buddy – The Buddy Holly Story, that played for 13 years in London, beginning in 1989 (transferring to the Strand Theatre in 1995).  After this, the theatre presented mostly revivals of well-known musicals.  In 2005, Billy Elliot the Musical opened, garnering rave reviews and Olivier Awards.

The theatre was purchased by Stephen Waley-Cohen in 1991. At the opening in 1911, a gilded statue of ballerina Anna Pavlova was positioned above the cupola of the theatre. This was taken down for its safety during World War II, and was lost. In 2006, a replica of the original statue was restored in its place.

In 2014, the theatre was sold to Delfont Mackintosh Theatres.
After Billy Elliot ended its run in April 2016, the theatre closed for a multi-million pound refurbishment. In December 2017, the Broadway musical Hamilton re-opened the refurbished Victoria Palace.

Notable productions

1930: The Chelsea Follies
1934: Young England
1937: Me and My Girl
1945: Variety
1947: The Crazy Gang
1962: The Black and White Minstrel Show
1974: Carry On London
1976: Cilla at the Palace
1978: Annie
1982: Windy City
1982: The Little Foxes
1986: Barnum
1986: Charlie Girl
1987: High Society
1989: Buddy – The Buddy Holly Story
1995: Jolson
2000: Fame
2001: Kiss Me, Kate
2002: Grease
2003: Tonight's the Night
2005: Billy Elliot the Musical
2017: Hamilton: An American Musical

Recent productions

 Fame (3 October 2000 – 8 September 2001) by Jacques Levy and Steve Margoshes
 Kiss Me, Kate (30 August 2001 – 24 August 2002)
 Grease (2 October 2002 – 6 September 2003) starring Ben Richards and Lee Latchford-Evans
 Tonight's the Night (7 November 2003 – 9 October 2004)
 Billy Elliot the Musical (11 May 2005 – 9 April 2016) by Lee Hall, starring Tim Healy and Haydn Gwynne.
 Hamilton (21 December 2017 – present) by Lin-Manuel Miranda

Nearby Tube stations
 Victoria

Notes

References
 Earl, John and Sell, Michael Theatres Trust Guide to British Theatres 1750–1950, pp. 145 (Theatres Trust, 2000) 
 Ronald Bergan: The Great Theatres of London. An Illustrated Companion (Prion: London, 1990).
 Patricia Dee Berry: Theatrical London (Britain in Old Photographs series) (Alan Sutton: Stroud, Gloucestershire, 1995).
 Ray Mander and Joe Mitchenson: 'Theatres of London', (Rupert Hart-Davis 1961, New English Library 1975)

External links

Theatre Website
Theatre history
Information about Young England

West End theatres
Theatres completed in 1911
1911 architecture
Theatres in the City of Westminster
Edwardian architecture in London
Grade II* listed buildings in the City of Westminster
Victoria, London
1911 establishments in England
Grade II* listed theatres